Telegrafi is an Albanian language newspaper published in Kosovo.  It was founded on December 26, 2006.

References

2006 establishments in Kosovo
Newspapers published in Kosovo
Publications established in 2006
Albanian-language newspapers